Mayabeque can refer to several places in Cuba:

 Mayabeque Province, created in 2011, comprising the eastern half of the former Havana Province
 Playa Mayabeque (Mayabeque Beach)
 Mayabeque River

pt:Mayabeque